Canute of Sweden - Swedish: Knut - may refer to:

Canute I, King of Sweden about 1167
Canute II, King of Sweden 1229
Canute the Great, claimant to the Swedish throne 11th century
Canute V of Denmark, Swedish prince 1130
Canute, Swedish prince around 1152, patrilineal grandson of King Sweartgar I
Canute, Swedish prince, died 1205, son of King Canute I